Attorney General Bertram may refer to:

Anton Bertram (1869–1937), Attorney General of Ceylon
Ron Bertram (1924–2014), Attorney-General of Western Australia